Jefferson Fredo Rodrigues (born February 28, 1978) is a former Brazilian football player.

Playing career
Jefferson joined Japanese J1 League club Verdy Kawasaki in 1999. He played many matches as offensive midfielder with many young players due to financial strain end of 1998 season. Verdy finished at the 7th place in 1999 season. He left the club end of 1999 season.

Club statistics

References

External links

http://www1.odn.ne.jp/~aab38980/veldy.htm

1978 births
Living people
Brazilian footballers
Brazilian expatriate footballers
J1 League players
Tokyo Verdy players
Expatriate footballers in Japan
Association football midfielders